Acrospermum is a genus of fungi within the Acrospermaceae family.

Species
Acrospermum adeanum
Acrospermum antennariicola
Acrospermum bromeliacearum
Acrospermum chilense
Acrospermum compressum
Acrospermum coniforme
Acrospermum cuneolum
Acrospermum cylindricum
Acrospermum daphniphylli
Acrospermum elmeri
Acrospermum erikssonii
Acrospermum fluxile
Acrospermum gaubae
Acrospermum graminum
Acrospermum kirulisianum
Acrospermum latissimum
Acrospermum maxonii
Acrospermum ochraceum
Acrospermum ophioboloides
Acrospermum pallidulum
Acrospermum parasiticum
Acrospermum puiggarii
Acrospermum savulescui
Acrospermum syconophilum
Acrospermum viticola

References

External links

Acrospermaceae
Dothideomycetes genera